Powellinia is a genus of moths of the family Noctuidae. It is now mostly considered a subgenus of Agrotis.

Species
 Powellinia boetica (Rambur, [1837])
 Powellinia lasserrei (Oberthür, 1881)
 Powellinia pierreti (Bugnion, 1838)

References
Natural History Museum Lepidoptera genus database
Powellinia at funet

Noctuinae